A Brand New Life is a 2009 film. It is the debut feature of director Ounie Lecomte, who directed and wrote the film.

Loosely based on Lecomte's own experience, A Brand New Life is set in Seoul in 1975. The film portrays a girl who is left in a Catholic orphanage by her father and her struggle to adjust to a new life.

A Brand New Life was released in South Korea on October 29, 2009. The film grossed over US$167,776 and was well received by critics. It won several awards, such as the Best Asian Film Award at the 22nd Tokyo International Film Festival and the jury award at the 2009 Cinekid Festival in Amsterdam.

Plot 
Jin-hee (Kim Sae-ron) is a 9-year-old girl whose father leaves her at an orphanage after remarrying. Before leaving her, her father buys her new clothes and a cake to convince her that she is going on a trip. This coincides with the Korean title, which literally means "traveler" or "tourist". In the orphanage, she tries to come to grips with the abandonment by her father and insecurities about a possible adoption. She gradually makes friendships, although she retains the belief that her father will return to take her back, and struggles (sometimes violently) not to adjust to her surroundings. In the end, Jin-hee is adopted by French parents who are eagerly waiting for her at an airport to meet their new child.

Cast
 Kim Sae-ron as Jin-hee
 Park Do-yeon as Sook-hee
 Go Ah-sung as Ye-shin
 Park Myung-shin as a nanny
 Sol Kyung-gu as Jin-hee's father
 Oh Man-seok as Director Goo
 Shin Young-sik as Ye-shin's foster father
 Moon Sung-keun as a doctor
 Richard Wilson as puppeteer/U.S. soldier
 Rob Youngs as Sook-hee's adoptive father
 Luke Doyle as guitarist/U.S. soldier 
 Harvey Schmidt as Jin-hee adoptive father

References

External links
 http://cafe.naver.com/traveler2009
 
 
 

2009 films
French drama films
South Korean drama films
2000s Korean-language films
Films shot in Seoul
2000s French films
2000s South Korean films